Tsvitkove is an urban-type settlement located in Cherkasy Raion (district) of Cherkasy Oblast (province) in central Ukraine. It is in Horodyshche urban hromada, one of the hromadas of Ukraine, the administration of which is located in the town of Horodyshche. Population: 

Until 18 July 2020, Tsvitkove belonged to Horodyshche Raion. The raion was abolished in July 2020 as part of the administrative reform of Ukraine, which reduced the number of raions of Cherkasy Oblast to four. The area of Horodyshche Raion was split between Cherkasy and Zvenyhorodka Raions, with Tsvitkove being transferred to Cherkasy Raion.

References

Urban-type settlements in Cherkasy Raion
Populated places established in 1960